Sombra (Spanish for shadow) may refer to:
 Alan Sombra (born 1994), Argentine footballer
 Sombra, Ontario, a village situated on the St. Clair River in Canada
 Sombra (Overwatch), a character in the 2016 video game and the subject of a related alternate reality game (ARG)
 King Sombra, a villain from My Little Pony: Friendship Is Magic
 La Sombra, a Tejano band
 La Sombra, former ring name of professional wrestler Andrade Cien Almas